The  is a railway line in Japan, operated by the private railway operator Keikyu. The line connects the Tokyo wards of Minato, Shinagawa, Ōta, and the Kanagawa municipalities of Kawasaki, Yokohama and Yokosuka. The Keikyu Main Line began as a short  line in 1895. By 1905 it was extended from Shinagawa Station in Tokyo to central Yokohama, becoming a major interurban line between the two cities.

Service types

Keikyu operates the following different types of service, including all-stations "Local" trains.

Abbreviations:
 Lo = : Stops at all stations
 AE = 
(1) between Sengakuji and Haneda Airport Terminal 1·2 (mornings and evenings only)
(2) between Zushi·Hayama and Haneda Airport Terminal 1·2
 LE =  (mornings and evenings only)
 LE = 
 A = 
 MW = : A "Home Liner" service with an additional charge for seat reservation. Operates only on weekday mornings from Miurakaigan on the Keikyu Kurihama Line to Shinagawa and Sengakuji.
 EW = : A "Home Liner" service with an additional charge for seat reservation. Operates only on weekday evenings from Shinagawa to Misakiguchi on the Keikyu Kurihama Line.

Stations
For connections and distances, see the route diagram.

History

All sections of the line were built as dual track. The Keihin Railway opened the Kawasaki to Omori section in 1901 as a 1,435 mm gauge line electrified at 600 V DC. In 1904, the line was regauged to 1,372 mm and extended to Shinagawa.

In 1930, the Shonan Electric Railway opened the Uraga to Koganecho section as a 1,435 mm gauge line electrified at 1,500 V DC. In 1931, the line from Yokohama was extended to connect at Koganecho. Freight services ceased in 1932, the line was regauged to 1,435 mm the following year, and in 1936, the voltage on the Shonan line was reduced to 600 V DC.

In 1941, the Shonan Electric Railway merged with the Keihin Railway, which merged with Tokyu the following year. The voltage on the entire line was raised to 1,500 V DC in 1945, and in 1948, the Keihin Electric Railway was created to operate the railway.

Keikyū Kamata Station was rebuilt as a new complex dual level junction to connect the Mainline with the Airport Line.

These stop at Yokosuka-chuo, Kanazawa-Bunko, and Kamiōoka en route.

Accidents
On 7 April 1997, at about 2:47 pm, the first three cars of a four-car train derailed after colliding with a mudslide, resulting in 22 people injured. Heavy rains caused the mudslide, 7 months after a report by the train company to the Transportation Minister that there was little probability of such an occurrence in that area. 500 workers were mobilized as the train service was temporarily suspended between Kanazawa-Hakkei and Horinouchi stations.

On 24 November 2000, at about 5:20 am, the front car of a four-car train derailed after a truck collided with the first car of the train at a level crossing, resulting in injuries to three passengers. The accident occurred in Yokosuka, and the approximately 100 commuters on board later walked about 200 m to the nearest station to continue their journeys via bus. The driver of the truck reported his foot became stuck between the accelerator and brake pedals, sending him through the crossing bar and into the crossing. Normal operations continued about 4 hours later that morning.

On 24 September 2012, at about 11:58 pm, the first three cars of an eight-car train derailed after colliding with a mudslide, resulting in injuries to 28 people including the train driver. Seven men and women were seriously injured, including fractures, broken ribs and pelvises. Heavy rains caused the mudslide, sweeping away safety nets that had been installed in 1998, the year after a similar mudslide in the area. An area of soil about 12 metres high and 15 metres wide fell onto the tracks, bringing trees and fencing structures with it. The train was travelling at  before the driver applied the brakes,  before the mudslide. Train services were temporarily suspended between Kanazawa-Hakkei and Hemi stations and temporary bus services were provided by the train company until normal operations resumed approximately 55 hours later after the assessment and clean-up process. The train was scrapped in the aftermath.

On 18 April 2013, at about 4:30 pm, two window panes shattered in the front car of a commuter train while passing an express train going the opposite direction, resulting in minor lacerations to two high school students sitting with their backs to the windows. One window pane was also cracked on the passing train with no injuries. The accident occurred between Keikyu Taura and Anjinzuka stations, with approximately 30 people in the car at the time of the accident.

On 5 September 2019 at 11:43 am, a rapid limited express (Aoto on the Keisei Oshiage Line to Misakiguchi) collided with a truck and derailed at a level crossing between Kanagawa-shimmachi and Nakakido Stations in Yokohama's Kanagawa Ward. The truck driver, identified as 67-year-old Michio Motohashi, was killed. 35 others were injured. According to the police and other reports, Motohashi was driving fruits from Yokohama to Narita and got stuck on the level crossing after attempting a right turn from a narrow side road that was not part of his normal route. Police were also investigating to see if the train operator correctly applied the brakes. Trains were suspended between Keikyū Kawasaki and Kamiōoka Stations until the afternoon of 7 September. The train was scrapped in the aftermath.

Gallery

See also
 List of railway lines in Japan

References
This article incorporates material from the corresponding article in the Japanese Wikipedia.

External links
 Keikyu website 

 
Main Line
Railway lines in Tokyo
Railway lines in Kanagawa Prefecture
Standard gauge railways in Japan
Railway lines opened in 1895
Articles containing video clips
1895 establishments in Japan